Guillaume Carlier is a French mathematician. Most of his work lies in the field of calculus of variation and optimization. He is a professor of applied mathematics at Paris Dauphine University and a researcher at Mokaplan, a joint INRIA-CNRS-Université Paris-Dauphine team dedicated to research in the field of optimal transport.

Life and work
Carlier's work mainly focuses on applied mathematics, in particular in the fields of calculus of variations, optimization, convex analysis, and transportation theory as well as their application to economics and traffic modelling.

He graduated in mathematics and mathematical economics from ENSAE ParisTech, Pierre and Marie Curie University, and Paris-Dauphine University in 1996. He then completed his PhD at Paris-Dauphine University in 2000, with a dissertation on the applications of calculus of variations to contract theory, under the supervision of Ivar Ekeland. After his studies, he was an assistant professor at the University of Bordeaux and then moved to Paris-Dauphine University, where he is now a professor. He is a member of Mokaplan, a joint research unit co-sponsored by Paris-Dauphine University, the National Centre for Scientific Research, and the French Institute for Research in Computer Science and Automation.

Selected publications

References

Year of birth missing (living people)
Applied mathematicians
Living people
French mathematicians